Perrinia is a genus of sea snails, marine gastropod mollusks in the family Chilodontaidae.

This genus has a long time been regarded as a subgenus of Turcica H. & A. Adams, 1854. Previously it was considered a (problematic) subgenus of Euchelus Philippi, 1847.

Description
The imperforate shell is small (less than 20 mm) and has a trochiform shape. The whorls are flattened and cancellated with a strongly indented suture. The aperture is quadrangular. The outer lip is lirate (= with fine linear elevations) within. The columella is short, nearly straight, with several tubercles near the base.

Species
According to the World Register of Marine Species (WoRMS) the following species are included within the genus Perrinia :
 Perrinia angulifera A. Adams, 1853
 Perrinia cantharidoides Vilvens, 2017
 Perrinia chinensis (G. B. Sowerby III, 1889)
 Perrinia concinna (A. Adams, 1864-f)
 Perrinia docili Poppe, Tagaro & Dekker, 2006
 Perrinia elisa (Gould, 1849)
 Perrinia guadalcanalensis Vilvens, 2017
 Perrinia konos (Barnard, 1964)
 Perrinia morrisoni (Ladd, 1966)
 Perrinia nigromaculata (Schepman, 1908)
 Perrinia squamicarinata (Schepman, 1908)
 Perrinia stellata (A. Adams, 1864)
Species brought into synonymy
 Perrinia cancellata (Schepman, 1908): synonym of Clypeostoma cancellatum (Schepman, 1908)
 Perrinia cecileae Poppe, Tagaro & Dekker, 2006: synonym of Clypeostoma cecileae (Poppe, Tagaro & Dekker, 2006) (original combination)
 Perrinia plicifera (Schepman, 1908): synonym of Perrinia angulifera (A. Adams, 1853)

References

External links
 Adams, H. & Adams, A. (1853-1858). The genera of Recent Mollusca; arranged according to their organization. London, van Voorst. Vol. 1: xl + 484 pp.; vol. 2: 661 pp.; vol. 3: 138 pls.
 Herbert D.G. (2012) A revision of the Chilodontidae (Gastropoda: Vetigastropoda: Seguenzioidea) of southern Africa and the south-western Indian Ocean. African Invertebrates, 53(2): 381–502

 
Chilodontaidae
Gastropod genera